Parabarrovia is a genus of moths of the family Noctuidae.

Species
 Parabarrovia keelei Gibson, 1920
 Parabarrovia omilaki Lafontaine, 1998
 Parabarrovia ogilviensis Lafontaine, 1988

References
Natural History Museum Lepidoptera genus database
Parabarrovia at funet

Noctuinae